Something Bad or variants may refer to:

"Somethin' Bad", song by Miranda Lambert and Carrie Underwood from the album Platinum
"Something Bad", song by Stephen Schwartz from the musical Wicked
"Something Bad", song by The Fatima Mansions from album Lost in the Former West
"Something Bad", song by Robin Thicke from the album Paula
"Something Bad", song by Hi-Fi and the Roadburners from the album Fear City